Coco was a 1969 Broadway musical with a book and lyrics by Alan Jay Lerner and music by André Previn, inspired by the life of Coco Chanel. It starred Katharine Hepburn in her only stage musical.

Background
Theatre producer Frederick Brisson originally had optioned Chanel's life for his wife Rosalind Russell, but Russell had developed acute arthritis, making it difficult for her to function. That meant another leading lady with star quality needed to be found. Irene Selznick suggested Katharine Hepburn, who initially scoffed at the idea of appearing in a musical but agreed to work with former MGM vocal coach Roger Edens for ten days. Following an audition in Selznick's suite at The Pierre Hotel, Hepburn felt comfortable enough to mull seriously the proposition, and was further convinced to accept the offer after meeting Chanel.

Lerner had assured the designer his book would cover only the early years of her life and career, and she was distressed when the plan was jettisoned to accommodate the older star. The highly fictionalized book and score underwent massive revisions and were far from complete when Hepburn concluded filming on The Madwoman of Chaillot, at which time she was scheduled to begin work on the show, and Coco was postponed a season while its creators worked on it.

The six-week rehearsal period finally began in September 1969. Cecil Beaton's set proved to be a complicated piece of machinery that frequently malfunctioned and was difficult for the cast to maneuver, and the final scene required a troublesome coordination of mirrors, platforms, runways, and flashing lights. Hepburn insisted the theater's thermostat be set at 60 degrees and the exterior doors left open, and most of the cast became ill due to the unusually cold fall weather.

Production
After 40 previews, the Broadway production opened on December 18, 1969, at the Mark Hellinger Theatre, where it ran for 329 performances. Directed by Michael Benthall and choreographed by Michael Bennett, the cast included René Auberjonois (who won a Tony Award for his performance), George Rose, Michael Allinson, David Holliday, Bob Avian, Jon Cypher, Suzanne Rogers, Graciela Daniele, Ann Reinking, and Gale Dixon. Danielle Darrieux replaced Hepburn eight months into the run, but without the drawing power of a major star the poorly reviewed show closed two months later.

Hepburn was scheduled to star in a West End production, but when the Theatre Royal, Drury Lane proved to be unavailable she refused to consider other venues and the project was abandoned. She headed the cast of the US national tour, which opened in Cleveland on January 11, 1971, the day after Chanel's death, which the star acknowledged at the final curtain call. She continued with the tour through June, when it ended at the Dorothy Chandler Pavilion in Los Angeles. Although reviews in most cities were mediocre, it played to sold-out houses everywhere. Despite its financial success, executives at Paramount Pictures, which had financed the original Broadway production - at $900,000, the most expensive show in Broadway history at the time - in exchange for the cast album and film rights, opted not to transfer Coco to the big screen.

During the autumn of 1971, Ginger Rogers starred in a stock tour of Coco that played the Westbury Music Festival, the South Shore Music Circus and the Valley Forge Music Fair. The tour was directed by Fred Hebert and choreographed by Larry Fuller.

Coco was produced as a staged concert by 42nd Street Moon in San Francisco in April and May 2008, starring Andrea Marcovicci in the title role.  The production played for a total of 16 performances.  It was directed by Mark D. Kaufmann and choreographed by Jayne Zaban. Marcovicci revisited the role in September 2010 for the show's first New York revival as part of the York Theatre Company's Musicals in Mufti.

Coco was presented in London's Sadler's Wells, in 2011, as part of the Lost Musicals project.  Ian Marshall Fisher directed, Chris Walker, music director. Coco was played by Sara Kestelman and cast included Edward Petherbridge.

Plot summary
Set between early autumn of 1953 and late spring of 1954, fashion designer Coco Chanel, after fifteen years of retirement, decides to return to the world of haute couture and reopen her Paris salon. With her new collection derided by the critics, she faces bankruptcy until buyers from four major American department stores  - Saks Fifth Avenue, Bloomingdale's, Best & Company, and Ohrbach's - place orders with her. She becomes involved with the love life of one of her models, and flashbacks utilizing filmed sequences recall her own past romantic flings. Adding humor to the proceedings is a highly stereotypical rude gay designer who tries to impede Chanel's success.  The finale is a fashion show featuring actual Chanel designs from 1918 to 1959.

Musical numbers

Act I
Overture
But That's the Way You Are - Alex
The World Belongs to the Young - Coco
Let's Go Home - Georges
Mademoiselle Cliche de Paris - Coco
On the Corner of the Rue Cambon - Coco
The Money Rings Out Like Freedom - Coco & Ensemble
A Brand New Dress - Noelle
A Woman Is How She Loves - Georges
Gabrielle - Papa
Coco - Coco
The Preparation - Coco & Company

Act II
Entre D'acte
Fiasco - Sebastian 
When Your Lover Says Goodbye - Greff
Coco (Reprise) - Coco
Ohrbach's, Bloomingdale's, Best & Saks -Coco & The Buyers
Ohrbach's, Bloomingdale's, Best & Saks (Reprise) - Coco and Ensemble
Always Mademoiselle - Coco and the Mannequins

A cast recording was released by Paramount Records in 1970. It was reissued on CD by MCA Records in 1997.

Awards and nominations

Original Broadway production

Notes

References
A Remarkable Woman: A Biography of Katharine Hepburn by Anne Edwards, published by William Morrow and Company (1985), pages 357-372

External links

Internet Broadway Database listing
Katharine Hepburn papers -- Letter from Katharine Hepburn about use of bad language in Coco!

1969 musicals
Broadway musicals
Musicals by Alan Jay Lerner
Compositions by André Previn
Plays based on real people
Plays set in the 1950s
Cultural depictions of Coco Chanel
Tony Award-winning musicals